The 2018 BGL BNP Paribas Luxembourg Open was a women's tennis tournament played on indoor hard courts sponsored by BNP Paribas. It was the 23rd edition of the Luxembourg Open, and part of the WTA International tournaments category of the 2018 WTA Tour. It was held in Kockelscheuer, Luxembourg from 15 to 20 October 2018.

Points and prize money

Point distribution

Prize money

1 Qualifiers prize money is also the Round of 32 prize money
* per team

Singles entrants

Seeds 

 Rankings as of 8 October 2018

Other entrants 
The following players received wildcards into the singles main draw:
  Fiona Ferro
  Mandy Minella
  Garbiñe Muguruza  

The following player received entry using a protected ranking into the singles main draw:
  Margarita Gasparyan

The following player received entry as a special exempt:
  Dayana Yastremska

The following players received entry from the qualifying draw:
  Belinda Bencic
  Eugenie Bouchard
  Arantxa Rus 
  Kristýna Plíšková

The following player received entry as a lucky loser:
  Varvara Lepchenko

Withdrawals 
Before the tournament
  Victoria Azarenka → replaced by  Kateryna Kozlova
  Sorana Cîrstea → replaced by  Dalila Jakupović
  Camila Giorgi → replaced by  Varvara Lepchenko
  Polona Hercog → replaced by  Carina Witthöft
  Rebecca Peterson → replaced by  Andrea Petkovic
  Monica Puig → replaced by  Anna Blinkova
  Venus Williams → replaced by  Anna Karolína Schmiedlová
  Tamara Zidanšek → replaced by  Johanna Larsson

Retirements
  Andrea Petkovic

Doubles entrants

Seeds 

 1 Rankings as of 8 October 2018

Other entrants
The following pairs received a wildcard into the doubles main draw:
  Greet Minnen /  Alison Van Uytvanck 
  Raluca Șerban /  Isabella Shinikova

Withdrawals
Before the tournament
  Monica Niculescu

Champions

Singles 

  Julia Görges def.  Belinda Bencic, 6–4, 7–5

Doubles

  Greet Minnen /  Alison Van Uytvanck def.  Vera Lapko /  Mandy Minella, 7–6(7–3), 6–2

References

External links 
 

2018 WTA Tour
2018
2018 in Luxembourgian tennis
Luxembourg Open